Lauren Phillips is an American pornographic actress and feature dancer.

Career
Phillips has co-hosted a talk radio program with James Bartholet titled Inside the Industry.
Phillips' website laurenphillips.com was nominated for Best Model Website at the 2018 AVN Awards. In April 2020, Phillips appeared on the Porn Stars Are People podcast hosted by Dan Frigolette.

Personal life 
In a February 2018 interview with The Daily Beast, Phillips opened up about the cyberbullying she has experienced on social media. The piece, which focused on porn stars who had recently committed suicide, Phillips said, “The way society looks at and treats porn stars makes us more depressed, it is hard to feel like we don’t belong or that we are second-class citizens,” Phillips continued saying “I have suffered depression because of the way people view my job. That is the worst part of this job, the way people treat me because of what I do for a living.”

Filmography

Television

Awards and nominations

References

Further reading

External links
 
 
 
 

Year of birth missing (living people)
Living people
American female models
American pornographic film actresses
People from Atlantic City, New Jersey
Victims of cyberbullying
21st-century American actresses